The 2000 Ole Miss Rebels football team represented the University of Mississippi during the 2000 NCAA Division I-A football season.  They participated as members of the Southeastern Conference in the West Division.  Coached by David Cutcliffe, the Rebels played their home games at Vaught–Hemingway Stadium in Oxford, Mississippi.

Schedule

Rankings

Roster
QB Eli Manning, Fr.
RB Deuce McAllister, Sr.

References

Ole Miss
Ole Miss Rebels football seasons
Ole Miss Rebels football